Dorothy Nancy Stroud MBE (11 January 1910 – 27 December 1997) was an English museum curator and biographer.

After Stroud died in 1997 her ashes went to Croome Park. A plaque by the statue of Capability Brown records her role in renewing interest in his life and works.

Selected publications
Capability Brown. Country Life, 1950. (2nd, Country Life, 1957) (3rd, Faber & Faber, London, 1975)
The architecture of Sir John Soane. Studio Books, 1961.
Humphry Repton. Country Life, 1962.
Henry Holland, his life and architecture. Country Life, 1966. 
George Dance, architect, 1741–1825. Faber & Faber, London, 1971.

References 

English biographers
Academics from London
1910 births
1997 deaths
English architectural historians
English art historians
Women art historians
British art curators